R v Boucher is a Supreme Court of Canada decision where the Court overturned a conviction for seditious libel on the grounds that criticizing the government was a valid form of protest.

Background
Aimé Boucher was a farmer in Beauce, Quebec, and a practising Jehovah's Witness. In 1946, he was arrested while distributing pamphlets entitled "Québec's Burning Hate for God and Christ and Freedom Is the Shame of all Canada." The pamphlets criticized the Québec government suppression of the Witnesses and the courts for doing nothing to prevent it. Boucher was charged for seditious libel — for endeavouring to promote public disorder — under section 133(2) of the Criminal Code. At trial, the jury found Boucher guilty, which was upheld on appeal.

Opinion of the Court
In a 5 to 4 decision, the Supreme Court held that the mere publishing of critical statements, without any intention to incite violence against the government, could not be seditious libel.

See also

Lamb v Benoit

References
 

Canadian freedom of expression case law
Supreme Court of Canada cases
1951 in Canadian case law
Jehovah's Witnesses litigation
Religion in Canada
Canadian criminal case law
Christianity and law in the 20th century
Sedition